Sadławki  is a village in Gmina Zalewo, Iława County, Warmian-Masurian Voivodeship, Poland.

References

Villages in Iława County